Sibongiseni Lucas Shabalala (born 20 May 1972), is a member of Ladysmith Black Mambazo, a South African choral group founded in 1960 (formerly led) by his father Joseph.

Sibongiseni was born in Ladysmith (eMnambithi district) to Joseph and his late wife Nellie, just shortly after the release of the group's first album Amabutho. In 1976, Joseph brought together his six sons to form Mshengu White Mambazo, Ladysmith's 'junior choir'.

After the murder of his uncle Headman Shabalala in December 1991 and the retirement of several other members (Inos Phungula, Geophrey Mdletshe and Ben Shabalala), Joseph later recruited Sibongiseni and his brothers Thamsanqa, Thulani and Msizi. Sibongiseni began singing with Mambazo as a bass voice and has remained in the line-up since 1993.

Together with his brother Thamsanqa and a well-known South African guitarist Maqhinga Radebe, Sibongiseni formed the maskandi-mbaqanga-isicathamiya crossover band Shabalala Rhythm in 1998, which has released successful releases to date including Ubuhle Bakho (2003) and Vuma (2005).

References

Ladysmith Black Mambazo members
20th-century South African male singers
1972 births
Living people
People from Ladysmith, KwaZulu-Natal
21st-century South African male singers